Messina Airfield is an abandoned World War II military airfield in Italy, which was located just to the west of Messina in Sicily. It was a temporary field built by the Army Corps of Engineers used as part of the Allied invasion of Italy.

The airfield was primarily used by the United States Army Air Force Twelfth Air Force 57th Fighter Group during 15–16 September 1943, flying combat operations with P-40 Warhawks.

When the 57th moved out to Reggio on the Itralian mainland the airfield was closed and dismantled. Today, there are no traces of the airfield remaining on the landscape visible from aerial photography, as the area has been developed as part of the urban area over the past 60 years.

References

 Maurer, Maurer. Air Force Combat Units of World War II. Maxwell AFB, Alabama: Office of Air Force History, 1983. .

External links

Airfields of the United States Army Air Forces in Italy
Airports established in 1943